20 Golden Greats was a compilation album of hits by Creedence Clearwater Revival released on the Fantasy record label in Australia and New Zealand in 1979. The album spent 2 weeks at the top of the Australian album charts in 1980.

Track listing

"Proud Mary" – 3:08
"Who'll Stop the Rain" – 2:28
"Hey Tonight" – 2:42
"Travelin' Band" – 2:09
"Lookin' Out My Back Door" – 2:32
"I Heard It Through the Grapevine" – 3:46
"Ooby Dooby" – 2:07
"Born on the Bayou" – 5:16
"I Put a Spell on You" – 4:31
"Sweet Hitch-Hiker" – 2:55
"Green River" – 2:34
"Bad Moon Rising" – 2:19
"Lodi" – 3:11
"Down on the Corner" – 2:44
"Fortunate Son" – 2:19
"Long as I Can See the Light" – 3:32
"Run Through the Jungle" – 3:06
"Up Around the Bend" – 2:40
"Have You Ever Seen the Rain?" – 2:39
"Susie Q" – 4:34

Chart positions

Certifications

References

1979 greatest hits albums
Creedence Clearwater Revival compilation albums
Albums produced by John Fogerty
Fantasy Records compilation albums
Albums produced by Saul Zaentz